The Milledgeville Micropolitan Statistical Area, as defined by the United States Census Bureau, is an area consisting of two counties in Georgia, anchored by the city of Milledgeville.

As of the 2000 census, the μSA had a population of 54,776 (though a July 1, 2009 estimate placed the population at 55,556).

Counties
Baldwin
Hancock

Communities
Mayfield (unincorporated)
Culverton (unincorporated)
Hardwick (census-designated place)
Milledgeville (Principal city)
Sparta

Demographics
As of the census of 2000, there were 54,776 people, 17,995 households, and 12,154 families residing within the μSA. The racial makeup of the μSA was 48.15% White, 49.71% African American, 0.20% Native American, 0.84% Asian, 0.01% Pacific Islander, 0.41% from other races, and 0.67% from two or more races. Hispanic or Latino of any race were 1.21% of the population.

The median income for a household in the μSA was $28,581, and the median income for a family was $34,984. Males had a median income of $28,645 versus $21,023 for females. The per capita income for the μSA was $13,594.

See also

Georgia census statistical areas

References

 
Metropolitan areas of Georgia (U.S. state)